Anéantir is a novel by Michel Houellebecq, published on 7 January 2022 by Éditions Flammarion. The novel's first print run was 300,000 copies.

Summary 
The novel mixes espionage and politics, mystery and romanticism. Jean Birnbaum of Le Monde called it a "political thriller that veers into metaphysical meditation." It envisions the years of 2026 and 2027 where France is in a period of decline. However, France shows some signs of revival and is without labour strikes but "the gap between the ruling classes and the populace has reached unprecedented levels." The country nonetheless remains in a state of moral decay with high levels of unemployment and rural poverty. It begins during the 2027 French presidential election with the outgoing president, although not named, is implied to be Emmanuel Macron. Right-wing figures Marine Le Pen and Éric Zemmour, however, appear by name.

Paul Raison, the novel's protagonist, is an adviser and confidant of the Minister of the Economy and Finance, Bruno Juge. He is the son of Édouard Raison, a former civil servant of the DGSI. As the nation is plunging into the feverish presidential campaign, mysterious cyberattacks start to take place. The sophisticated nature of the attacks leaves the best computer scientists of the DGSI scrambling for answers. One of the videos posted on the internet shows the virtual beheading of Minister Bruno Juge by guillotine. This environment of cyberterrorism defines the atmosphere of the election. The young outgoing president is completing his second term, having "given up the fantasies of a start-up nation which won his first election, but had objectively resulted only in the creation of a few precarious underpaid jobs." The election candidates include, on the presidential majority side, the Minister of the Economy and a character who resembles media personality Cyril Hanouna. In the opposition, a young far-right candidate is dangerously close behind the favorite in the polls.

At over 700 pages, Anéantir is unusual for its slow pace and its tone, which is characterised more by compassion than irony. Raison's relationship with his wife, Prudence, an official of the Treasury, has become strained, while the ties with his siblings have long been disjointed. The stroke of their father presents an opportunity for siblings Cécile, a fervent Catholic, Aurélien, a sensitive artist, and Paul, an énarque in search of meaning, to repair their relationship. They are determined to get their father, who is sick in a vegetative state, out of the center where he is wasting away. However, Paul himself is later stricken with illness. The narrative explores themes of faith and love. France Inter described the narrative as a "Houellebecq somewhere between nihilism and romanticism." On Europe 1 Dimitri Pavlenko said, "You might think this is a sinister and pessimistic Houellebecq. But no. Many of the characters are searching for goodness and the message of the book could be: "Love saves".

Characters 
 Bastien Doutremont – a forty-something computer scientist working as a contractor for the General Directorate for Internal Security (DGSI)
 Fred – a forty-something computer scientist working as a contractor for the General Directorate for Internal Security (DGSI)
 Bruno Juge – the Minister of the Economy and Finance
 Paul Raison – an official of the Minister of the Economy and Finance
 Prudence – an official of the Treasury Department, wife of Paul Raison
 Édouard Raison – the father of Paul Raison
 Madeleine – the partner of Édouard Raison
 Suzanne Raison – the mother of Paul Raison, art conservationist
 Cécile Raison – the sister of Paul Raison (and daughter of Édouard and Suzanne Raison)
 Hervé – the husband of Cécile Raison, unemployed notary
 Aurélien Raison – the brother of Paul Raison (and son of Édouard and Suzanne Raison), art conservationist
 Véronique – the former wife of Paul Raison

Influences 

The character of Bruno Juge, Minister of the Economy and Finance, is likely a reference to Bruno Le Maire (Minister of the Economy and Finance at the time of the novel's publication). In October 2021, Bruno Le Maire, a personal friend of Houellebecq, revealed some elements of the novel's plot.

Online leak 
Less than three weeks before its publication, the first pages of the novel were illegally distributed on social media, and, on 21 December 2021, a complete digital copy was circulated, presumably made from a scan of the book since no digital version was released. Only print copies were sent to literary journalists, with a formal request from the publisher not to reveal any details of the novel's plot until 30 December 2021.

Reception 
Reviews for Anéantir have been largely positive. Jean Birnbaum of Le Monde wrote, "The most poignant pages of his novel are those in which he manages to bring to life, amid solitude and dereliction, fleeting gestures that make you cry." Étienne Campion of Marianne called it a "profound novel about illness, suffering, agony, and death, which will surprise, even irritate, many readers." The daily newspapers Le Figaro and Libération, who are positioned on opposing sides of the political spectrum, were in agreement in praising the success of the novel's storyline. Likewise, a favourable reception was received from the magazine Elle and from regional daily newspapers such as Ouest-France et La Voix du Nord.

Mediapart panned the novel, writing, "All these nauseating words are distilled in small touches, as in the minor mode." Left-wing publications L'Obs, Les Inrockuptibles and L'Humanité also published unfavourable reviews of the novel, deviating from their usual acclaim of Houellebecq's work. L'Obs criticized the novel's length and described it as "a yawn."

Footnotes

References 

2022 French novels
Novels by Michel Houellebecq
Éditions Flammarion books
Novels set in France
Novels set in the 2020s
Fiction set in 2026
Fiction set in 2027
French political novels
Cyberwarfare in popular culture
Novels about elections
Works about cybercrime
Books about computer hacking